The 1982–83 Marquette Warriors men's basketball team represented Marquette University during the 1982–83 college basketball season.

Schedule

|-
!colspan=9 style=| Regular season

|-
!colspan=9 style=| NCAA tournament

References

Marquette Golden Eagles men's basketball seasons
Marquette
Marquette
Marq
Marq